Stanley Sanudi (born 2 February 1995) is a Malawian footballer who plays as a right back for Mighty Wanderers and the Malawi national team. He was included in Malawi's squad for the 2021 Africa Cup of Nations.

References

External links

1995 births
Living people
Malawian footballers
Association football defenders
Mighty Tigers FC players
Mighty Wanderers FC players
Malawi international footballers
2021 Africa Cup of Nations players